Leonida Tonelli (19 April 1885 – 12 March 1946) was an Italian mathematician, noted for creating Tonelli's theorem, a variation of Fubini's theorem, and for introducing semicontinuity methods as a common tool for the direct method in the calculus of variations.

Education
Tonelli graduated from the University of Bologna in 1907; his Ph.D. thesis was written under the direction of Cesare Arzelà.

Work

Selected publications
 , 1900
 . Zanichelli, Bologna, vol. 1: 1922, vol. 2: 1923
 
 . Zanichelli, Bologna 1928

See also
Calculus of variations
Fourier series
Lebesgue integral
Mathematical analysis

Notes

References

Biographical and general references
. The "Yearbook" of the renowned Italian scientific institution, including an historical sketch of its history, the list of all past and present members as well as a wealth of information about its academic and scientific activities.
, available from the Biblioteca Digitale Italiana di Matematica.
. "The work of Leonida Tonelli and his influence on scientific thinking in this century" (English translation of the title) is an ample commemorative article, reporting recollections of the Author about teachers and colleagues, and a detailed survey of his and theirs scientific work, presented at the International congress in occasion of the celebration of the centenary of birth of Mauro Picone and Leonida Tonelli (held in Rome on May 6–9, 1985).
.
. "Leonida Tonelli and the Pisa mathematical school" is a survey of the work of Tonelli in Pisa and his influence on the development of the school, presented at the International congress in occasion of the celebration of the centenary of birth of Mauro Picone and Leonida Tonelli (held in Rome on May 6–9, 1985). The Author was one of his pupils and, after his death, held his chair of mathematical analysis at the University of Pisa, becoming dean of the faculty of sciences and then rector: he exerted a strong positive influence on the development of the university.
. This paper, included in the Proceedings of the Study Meeting in Memory of Giuseppe Gemignani, is an account of the failures of Vito Volterra, Leonida Tonelli and Francesco Severi, when dealing with particular research problems during their career. An English translation of the title reads as:-"Three battles lost by three great Italian mathematicians".
. The brief "participating address" presented to the International congress on the occasion of the celebration of the centenary of birth of Mauro Picone and Leonida Tonelli (held in Rome on May 6–9, 1985) by Olga Oleinik on behalf of the Moscow Mathematical Society. 
. The brief "participating address" presented to the International congress on the occasion of the celebration of the centenary of birth of Mauro Picone and Leonida Tonelli (held in Rome on May 6–9, 1985), by Giovanni Battista Rizza on behalf of the University of Parma: the scientific relations between Leonida Tonelli and the Department of Mathematics in Parma are described. 
. The commemoration of Tullio Levi Civita, Guido Fubini, Leonida Tonelli and Michele De Franchis published on the "Annali di Matematica".
. Some recollections about Mauro Picone and Leonida Tonelli, presented by Ian Sneddon as the "participating address" (Italian translation of the title of the contribution) to the International congress on the occasion of the celebration of the centenary of birth of Mauro Picone and Leonida Tonelli (held in Rome on May 6–9, 1985) on behalf of the Royal Society of London and of the Royal Society of Edinburgh.

Scientific references
. Measure and integration (as the English translation of the title reads) is a definitive monograph on integration and measure theory: the treatment of the limiting behavior of the integral of various kind of sequences of measure-related structures (measurable functions, measurable sets, measures and their combinations) is somewhat conclusive.
. The proceedings of the International congress on the occasion of the celebration of the centenary of birth of Mauro Picone and Leonida Tonelli, held in Rome on May 6–9, 1985, at the Accademia Nazionale dei Lincei.
.

External links

1885 births
1946 deaths
Mathematical analysts
Variational analysts
Members of the Lincean Academy
19th-century Italian mathematicians
20th-century Italian mathematicians
Academic staff of the Scuola Normale Superiore di Pisa
Functional analysts